The Grotta del Ninfeo is an artificial cavity in the rock of Temenite Hill (named after the Greek temenos, "sacred precinct") located in the Archaeological park of Neapolis in Syracuse.

Terrace of Temenite Hill 
The grotta is located near the highest part of the little rocky relief, on a rectangular terrace which verges on the Greek theatre and opens at the centre of a stone wall where a closed portico in the form of an "L" was once found. At the entrance there were statues dedicated to the Muses, three of which (dated to the 2nd century BC) are still preserved and are on display at the Museo archeologico regionale Paolo Orsi. The fountain is dedicated to the Ancient Greek cult of the nymphs, nature goddesses. The name nymphaeum for a monumental, decorated fountain derives from this.

The Syracusan nymphaeum is thought to have been the ancient location of the Mouseion (the sanctuary of the Muses), seat of the artistic guild, where the Syracusan actors gathered before descending into the theatre to put on comedies and tragedies in the time of Epicharmus and Aeschylus.

Regarding the Grotta del Ninfeo, the Syracusan Giuseppe Politi wrote in the nineteenth century:

The grotto has a vaulted ceiling and inside it there is a rectangular tub in which the water collects before cascading from a cavity located at the bottom of the rock wall. Next to the entrance, there are some votive aedicula which were used for hero cults (Pinakes). To the east of the Grotta del Ninfeo, the last watermill from the Spanish period remains visible even today. It took water from the grotta and redirected it into the theatre after using it to mill grain. From nymphaeum, one continues to the Via dei Sepolcri and from there to the summit of the hill, where there are other Graeco-Roman monuments. 

The water that flows into the Grotta derives from two separate aqueducts, both of Greek date; one is called the Acquedotto del Ninfeo (Nymphaeum Aqueduct) after the Grotta, while the other is the Galermi Aqueduct.

Depiction by Jean Hoüel 
During one of his trips to Syracuse in the second half of the 1700s, the painter Jean-Pierre Houël depicted the Grotta del Ninfeo as he found it. The gouache shows a much deeper grotta than today, with water descending towards the theatre, where the mills were installed. In the grotta, some women are busy making cloth.

Gallery

See also 

Nymphaeum

References

External links 
Grotta del Ninfeo  - IbmsNet 
assindustria - Grotta del Ninfeo - Siracusa
Canale Galermi - Archeologia Siracusa - Antoniorandazzo.it
Parco Archeologico della Neapolis - Grotta del Ninfeo
Siracusa - Parco archeologico della Neapoli - Grotta del Ninfeo - Sevaistre, Eugène
Neàpolis Siracusa - Maridelsud 

Fountains in Italy
Grottoes
Ancient Syracuse
Archaeological sites in Sicily